The Wheel of Brisbane (also Brisbane Eye) is an Observation Wheel in Brisbane, Queensland, Australia.

It was erected in 2008 at the northern entrance to South Bank Parklands, the transformed World Expo 88 site by the Brisbane River, as part of the 20th anniversary of World Expo 88 and the 150th anniversary of the State of Queensland 1859–2009 celebrations. Its August opening coincided with the annual Riverfire event.

Each of the 42 air-conditioned capsules can seat up to six adults and two children providing a total passenger capacity of 336. The ride lasts for approximately 12 minutes and provides 360° views across the city.

During the 2011 Brisbane floods, the Wheel was damaged by water.

References

External links
 Official site

Brisbane
Transportable Ferris wheels
Culture of Brisbane
Tourist attractions in Brisbane
Buildings and structures in Brisbane
Landmarks in Brisbane
South Brisbane, Queensland
2008 establishments in Australia